Ley (the Ley, plural: the Leyen) is an old German word for rock, cliff or crag which often occurs in placenames.

Etymology 
Ley, also lay, lei, lai, laige or lägge, and, according to Grimm, leie, is a commonly occurring name for rocks or crags in the Rhenish and Lower German language regions. It is derived from the Old Saxon word, lêia. It is particularly associated with rock precipices (Felsabbrüche) and rock faces (Felswände), but also with rock slabs (Felsplatte). In addition, it is also used in the sense of shale or slate (Leienstein), and also to mean "slate" in the sense of a blackboard or roofing tile (Leiendecker). Its Dutch form is leyde or leye.

According to Celtologists at the University of Trier the term may have originally come from the Gallic (Celtic) word, lika, likka which means "rock slab/sheet.
 
In addition to natural rock walls, an artificial quarry, such as the basalt quarries of the Eifel, may be called a Ley or Lay. The workers there are known as Layer''.

Examples 

 Loreley, a well known slate hill on the Rhine
 Tholey, parish and abbey in the northern Saarland
 Theley, a village in the  parish of Tholey
 Erpeler Ley, a basalt rock face above the Rhine
 the Koblenz quarter of Lay
 Kaiserlei, a quarter in the city of Offenbach, named after a rock above the River Main
 the Rabenlay is a hill in the Siebengebirge range, at the foot of which was found the double grave of Oberkassel.
 the Rabenlay is a shallows in the Rhine at river kilometre 548.5-549.0 near Oberwesel
 Mendiger Ley, basalt mine
 Leybucht near Norden (East Frisia)
 Plästerlegge ("raining slate rock"), waterfall near the Bestwig village of Wasserfall
 Geierlay in (Mörsdorf Hunsrück), Germany's second longest suspension bridge

References 

Oronyms